The Sarvis Creek Wilderness is a U.S. Wilderness Area located south of Steamboat Springs, Colorado in the Routt National Forest. The area is named after the Sarvis Timber Company, which once logged the area. The area contains no alpine tundra, in contrast to most wilderness areas in Colorado.

References

Wilderness areas of Colorado
Protected areas established in 1993
Protected areas of Grand County, Colorado
Protected areas of Routt County, Colorado
Routt National Forest